Arnet  may refer to:

As a surname or given name 
Hugo Arnet (also spelled Arnot), Scottish advocate
Jan Arnet, bass player for The Head Hunters
Edward Arnet Johnson, American basketball player
Josef Kalt (later known as Josef Kalt-Arnet), Swiss rower

Other uses 
Arnet Pereyra Sabre II, aircraft
ArnetMiner, software

See also 
 Arnett (name)